Rugby Club L'Hospitalet is a Spanish rugby team based in L'Hospitalet de Llobregat (Barcelona). Founded in 1973 as Unió Esportiva Bellvitge, it changed its name to the current one in 1984. The club has won the Spanish women's rugby championship three times.

History
The club was founded in 1973.

Home ground
RC L'Hospitalet plays its games at the Municipal Rugby Field, which is part of the Feixa Llarga sports complex, in Bellvitge, a complex where there are also other facilities such as the Municipal Football Stadium or the Municipal Baseball Field. The pitch, made of natural grass, has dimensions of 140m x 70m. The venue has grandstands for approx. 320 spectators.

Season to season

2 seasons in División de Honor
9 seasons in División de Honor B

External links
Official website

Sport in L'Hospitalet de Llobregat
Rugby clubs established in 1973
Rugby union teams in Catalonia
1973 establishments in Spain